Westpark Foundries, founded 2001, is a United States movies, television and web content development corporation. In 2003, Westpark began to move into handheld device programming and licensed content representation. In 2004, Westpark began to represent programming in the IPTV sector.

Today Westpark Foundries represents the work of over 300 filmmakers ranging from Oscar nominated directors to home movies. They are actively involved in mobile content distribution, IPTV distribution, producer's representation, and other aspects of traditional film sales and home video distribution.

Entertainment companies of the United States
Entertainment companies established in 2001